T. Mark Mustio (born September 3, 1957) is a Republican former member of the Pennsylvania House of Representatives for the 44th District and was elected in special election in June 2003.

Career
Prior to running for the House, Mustio was a partner in an insurance brokerage firm.

In 2000, Mustio was elected to the Moon Township Board of Supervisors, serving as Chairman of that body. On June 17, 2003, Mustio was elected to represent the 44th legislative district in a special election to fill the remainder of John Pippy's term. Mustio won a full term in 2004 and was re-elected in 2006.

For the 2009-10 legislative session, Mustio serves on the House Labor Relations, Liquor Control, Professional Licensure and Urban Affairs Committees. He is also a member of the Legislative Budget and Finance Committee, Pittsburgh Port Commission and the Joint State Government Commission Tasks Forces and Advisory Committee.

In 2012, Mustio ran for the Pennsylvania State Senate seat representing the 37th District to succeed retiring Republican incumbent John Pippy. He was defeated in a three-way Republican primary by D. Raja on April 24, 2012.

References

External links
Representative Mustio's official web site
PA House profile

1957 births
Living people
Grove City College alumni
Republican Party members of the Pennsylvania House of Representatives
People from Moon Township, Allegheny County, Pennsylvania
Politicians from York, Pennsylvania
American Presbyterians
21st-century American politicians